KCIZ-LP (103.5 FM) is a radio station licensed to serve Brunswick, Minnesota. Its call sign was assigned by the Federal Communications Commission on January 23, 2014, and the station was issued its broadcast license on January 17, 2017. KCIZ-LP is owned by the Lakes Media Foundation, a non-profit organization based in Mora, Minnesota.

The station is branded as Lakes 103. It airs a locally originated, automated Oldies format, consisting primarily of Top 40 music from the 1960s, 1970s, and early 1980s. Local weather forecasts and community calendar announcements are also broadcast periodically.

External links
Lakes 103 official website
Lakes Media Foundation website
Kanabec County Times article on KCIZ-LP
Press release: "Secrets revealed: Lakes 103 and other new details"
 

Radio stations in Minnesota
Low-power FM radio stations in Minnesota
Kanabec County, Minnesota
Radio stations established in 2017
2017 establishments in Minnesota